The 1971 Volunteer 500 was a NASCAR Winston Cup Series racing event that took place on July 11, 1971, at Bristol Motor Speedway in Bristol, Tennessee.

The race car drivers still had to commute to the races using the same stock cars that competed in a typical weekend's race through a policy of homologation (and under their own power). This policy was in effect until roughly 1975. By 1980, NASCAR had completely stopped tracking the year model of all the vehicles and most teams did not take stock cars to the track under their own power anymore.

Race report
Thirty American-born drivers competed for 500 laps in a race lasting more than two and a half hours. More than 20,000 people would see Charlie Glotzbach beat Bobby Allison to the checkered line by more than three laps through replacement driver Raymond "Friday" Hassler. He would replace Glotzbach for a few stints of the race as a relief driver because of the immense heat and humidity. Johnny Allen and Jack Smith would do the same thing earlier in 1961; while Fred Lorenzen and Ned Jarrett did it in 1963.

Since Glotzbach qualified for this race, he received credit for what would become his final win in the NASCAR Winston Cup Series. This race was completely clean with no yellow or red flags given out by NASCAR authorities. While the lead was exchanged seven different times in the race, the average speed of the race was clocked at a mere . As of 2011, this record-setting pace is still seen as a respectably fast speed for Bristol Motor Speedway. Chevrolet started to regain their respectability as a fast and reliable vehicle manufacturer after partaking in their first victory since the 1967 Grand National Series season. NASCAR historians would later recognize this win as the first win for the Chevrolet Monte Carlo. In future races, NASCAR would start to manipulate the races so that there would be no caution-free races. The last race to be done in the NASCAR Cup Series without a caution was at the 2002 EA Sports 500 which took place at Talladega Superspeedway. Dale Earnhardt Jr. would go on to win that race.

Notable crew chiefs at the race were Junie Donlavey, Dale Inman, Vic Ballard, and Lee Gordon.

Raymond Williams and Dick May would quit the race for reasons unknown. Bill Shirey acquired the last-place finish due to an ignition problem on lap 5. Richard D. Brown noticed that his vehicle's transmission stopped working on lap 15. Wayne Smith crashed his vehicle on lap 18 while Ed Negre fell out with engine failure on lap 40. G.C. Spencer would no longer have a working engine on lap 59. Bill Seifert managed to overheat his vehicle on lap 63. Paul Tyler lost the rear end of his vehicle on lap 70. Friday Hassler lost the wheel bearings on his vehicle on lap 103 while vehicular vibration problems forced Ken Meisenhelder out of the race on lap 131.

A problematic lug bolt sent Dean Dalton out of the race on lap 167. Earl Brooks lost the rear end of his vehicle on lap 168. A faulty spindle eliminated Ron Keselowski out of the race on lap 263 while lug bolt issues sent Bill Dennis out of the race on lap 328. Coo Coo Marlin was the last DNF of the race; having to bow out of the race due to an overheating vehicle on lap 369. The closest battle on the track at the checkered flag was between Jabe Thomas and Walter Ballard for 10th and 11th, 55 laps down.

Drivers that failed to qualify for this race were: Richard Childress, D.K. Ulrich, Bill Dennis, and Frank Warren. The amount of money in the racing purse was $26,970 ($ when adjusted for inflation).

Qualifying

Top twenty drivers

 Charlie Glotzbach
 Bobby Allison
 Richard Petty
 Cecil Gordon
 James Hylton
 Elmo Langley
 Frank Warren
 Bill Champion
 J.D. McDuffie
 Jabe Thomas
 Walter Ballard
 Henley Gray
 John Sears
 Coo Coo Marlin
 Bill Dennis
 Don Tarr
 Ron Keselowski
 Earl Brooks
 Dean Dalton
 Ken Meisenhelder

References

Volunteer 500
Volunteer 500
NASCAR races at Bristol Motor Speedway